The pool stage of the 2008–09 Heineken Cup began on 10 October 2008, with the final match played on 25 January 2009. This was the first year for which qualified teams were seeded for the group stage.

Ranking system
The 24 teams were ranked according to previous progress in the Heineken Cup, with teams from the same tier and same country being placed in separate pools. The brackets show each team's ERC Ranking before the start of the 2008-2009 season.

The draw for the pool stage took place on 17 June 2008 in Dublin.

Pool stage

The draw for the pool stages took place on 17 June 2008 in Dublin.

{| class="wikitable"
|+ Key to colours
|-
| style="background:#cfc;"|     
| Winner of each pool,advance to quarterfinals. Seed # in parentheses
|-
| style="background:#ccf;"|     
| Two highest-scoring second-place teams,advance to quarterfinals. Seed # in parentheses
|}

Pool 1

 Munster qualified for the quarter-finals as Pool 1 winners following a bonus point fifth round home win over Sale.

Pool 2

Pool 3

Pool 4

 Harlequins qualified for the quarter-finals as Pool 4 winners following the Scarlets' fifth round home win over Stade Français.

Pool 5

Pool 6

Notes:
 Cardiff Blues qualified for the quarter-finals as Pool 6 winners with a fifth round away win over Gloucester. The bonus point win in the final round of the group stages secured their position as top seed and a home quarter-final.
 Cardiff Blues become only the sixth side in the competition's history to win all six of their pool matches.
 Biarritz place above Gloucester by virtue of having scored more tries in their two head-to-head matches: 4 to 2.

Seeding and runners-up
The winners of each of the six pools are seeded 1 to 6 first by points, then tries scored, and finally score difference. The runners-up are similarly sorted, and the best two are seeded seven and eight and progress to the quarter-finals alongside the six winners. The top four seeds are given home matches in the quarter-finals, with seed 1 playing seed 8, seed 2 playing seed 7 etc.

References

External links
European Rugby Cup : Pools

Heineken Cup pool stages
Pool stage